Coenobita spinosus is one of the sixteen species of terrestrial hermit crabs.

Range and habitat 

C. spinosus can be found on Polynesian islands, Melanesia, Micronesia, the Marianne Islands and the northern coast of Australia, New Caledonia, Wallis and Futuna, and Henderson Island in the Pitcairn Islands where it has been observed to use plastic debris for protection.

C. spinosus notably lives in forests and wetlands, but can also be found on beaches and in lagoons.

Anatomy 
They possess long hairy spines on their legs; although some other species have these spines, none are as long as C. spinosus.

References

Hermit crabs
Taxa named by Henri Milne-Edwards
Crustaceans described in 1837